Abdiaziz Hassan Mohamed (Laftagareen) 
 is the fourth president of the South West State of Somalia who was elected by the people of South West state elected in 19 Dec 2018 by the federal member of parliaments. 
In 2019, Laftagareen had a committee appointed to deal with security issues. Laftagareen had close ties with the political party of the concurrent presidency of the country Nabad & Nolol.

Abdiaziz Hassan Mohamed has one wife and four children.  He completed his primary, middle and high school education in Luuq.  He was a school teacher in Luuq.  He studied at a university in Mogadishu. Abdiaziz Laftagareen has held many positions in previous governments.

Early life and education
He completed his primary, middle and high school education in luau ganaane. He was a school teacher in Luuq. He studied at a university in Mogadishu.

Career
In 2007, he was the Deputy General Manager of Mogadishu Port. In 2008, he was Minister of Labor and Social Affairs in the government of Prime Minister Nur Adde. In 2009, he was the Minister of Transport and Maritime Affairs in the government of Omar Abdirashid Ali Sharmarke. in 2010, he was Minister of Livestock in the government of Prime Minister Omar Abdirashid Ali Sharmarke.

He was the Minister of State for Posts in the government of Prime Minister Mohamed Abdullahi Farmajo. He was the Minister of Information and Telecommunications in the government of Prime Minister Abdiweli Sheikh Ahmed. Laftagareen was the deputy minister of fisheries, in the government of Prime Minister Hassan Ali Khaire, He was the state minister for trade. Abdiaziz Hassan Mohamed Laftagareen ran for speaker of parliament. He was the Minister of Energy and Water Resources.

Abdiaziz Hassan Mohamed (Laftagareen) won the presidential election in the South West state, receiving 101 votes while the next candidate Aden Mohamed Nur Saransor received 22 votes.

As the president of South West State, he has signed the South West State of Somalia Development Plan 2021-2025 prepared by the Ministry of Investment Planning and Economic Development of South West State.

References

Presidents of South West State of Somalia
Living people
Ethnic Somali people
1970 births